Agassiz Recreational Trail is a , multi-use rail trail in northwest Minnesota, United States, between the towns of Crookston and Ulen. Hiking, bicycling, horseback riding, cross-country skiing, snowmobiling and ATV riding are allowed on the natural-surface trail. The trail is owned by Clay, Norman and Polk counties. Representatives from each county serving on a joint powers board operate the trail. The trail should not be confused with the Agassiz Interpretive Trail in Manitoba, Canada.

Route 
Agassiz Recreational Trail was converted from an abandoned rail bed running parallel to state highways 32 and 102. The route traverses sparsely wooded rural farmland. There are a number of rivers and creek crossings along the route, including the Sand Hill, Wild Rice and South Branch Wild Rice Rivers, and Mashaug Creek.

The trail passes through several towns (in order from south to north):
 Ulen (southern terminus)
 Twin Valley
 Gary
 Fertile
 Crookston (northern terminus)

See also 
 Multi-use trail

References

External links 
 Minnesota Department of Natural Resources: Agassiz Recreation Trail Map

Rail trails in Minnesota
Protected areas of Polk County, Minnesota
Protected areas of Clay County, Minnesota
Protected areas of Norman County, Minnesota
Hiking trails in Minnesota